Science Fair is a 2018 National Geographic documentary film that premiered at the 2018 Sundance Film Festival, winning the first ever Festival Favorite Award.

Synopsis 
It covers the lives of 9 teenagers as they prepare for the Intel International Science and Engineering Fair. Characters followed in the film include Kashfia Rahman, a student from South Dakota who did research on the effects of risk-taking behaviors in teenagers, Anjali Chadha, a student from Kentucky who designed a project to test for arsenic, Ivo Zell, a German student who designed a new method of airplane propulsion, and two Brazilian students who innovate a way to treat the Zika virus.

Reception

Awards 
Regarding the Festival Favorite Award, it was described as "so engaging and inspiring that we felt it would delight audiences and be a strong contender for this award" by the director of the Sundance Film Festival, and as "an ode to the teenage science geeks on whom our future depends". The movie also received the Festival Favorite award from the 2018 South by Southwest Film Festival and the Best Documentary Award from the 2018 Portland International Film Festival. It was nominated for an Emmy for Outstanding Science and Technology Documentary at the 40th News and Documentary Emmy Award.

References 

National Geographic Society films
2018 documentary films
Documentary films about science
2018 films
2010s English-language films
2010s American films